The 1943–44 Tercera División was the 8th edition of the Spanish third national tier. The competition was divided into 2 phases.

League tables

Group I

Group II

Group III

Group IV

Group V

Aragón

Valencia

Group V Final

Group VI

Group VII

Group VIII

Promotion playoff

First round

Group I

Group II

Final Round

Relegation playoff

First round

Final Round

External links
 Official LFP Site

Tercera División seasons
3
Spain